Peter German  is a Canadian legal academic and anti-money laundering expert. He is best known as the author of the Dirty Money reports, as well as serving as the former deputy commissioner of the Royal Canadian Mounted Police.

Personal life 
German was born in 1952 in Vancouver, British Columbia, and currently lives in the city where he operates an anti-money laundering consultancy. He completed his PhD in law in 2010.

Career 
German served in various law enforcement and intelligence roles, and  runs a private legal consultancy.

Law Enforcement 
German previously served as the RCMP commander for Lower Mainland from 2007 to 2011. He subsequently served as the deputy commissioner for the RCMP, and the deputy commissioner at the Correctional Service of Canada.

Academia 
German is the author of Proceeds of Crime and Money Laundering, considered the “leading anti-money laundering law” textbook in Canada.

Peter German & Associates 
German operates a private consultancy that provides legal expertise in organized crime and money laundering. The firm was notably contracted by the Government of British Columbia to assess the extent if money laundering in Canada. The firm produced the Dirty Money reports for the province, resulting in the Cullen Commission.

Dirty Money Reports 

German’s Dirty Money reports linked Canada’s extensive money laundering problem to global crime networks, and argued Canada had become a world-class destination for transnational crime. The report resulted in the Cullen Commission.

References 

Royal Canadian Mounted Police commissioners
Living people
People from Vancouver
Alumni of the University of London
Canadian police officers
Year of birth missing (living people)